Petra Rossner (born 14 November 1966) is a German cyclist, who won the gold medal in 3 km pursuit track cycling at the 1992 Summer Olympics in Barcelona. In the same event she won the 1991 World Championships and finished second in 1989.

Competing in road bicycle racing, she won the World Cup in 2002. She finished second in 2004, and finished third in the 1988 Giro d'Italia Femminile. She is a seven-time winner of the Liberty Classic—winning the event in 1996, 1998, 1999, 2000, 2001, 2002 and 2004.

Rossner retired after the 2004 season.

Private life

From 1996 on, she was living in Leipzig with her partner Judith Arndt. They have since split.

References

External links
Personal Website 

1966 births
Living people
Cyclists at the 1988 Summer Olympics
Cyclists at the 1992 Summer Olympics
Cyclists at the 2000 Summer Olympics
East German female cyclists
Lesbian sportswomen
LGBT cyclists
German LGBT sportspeople
Olympic cyclists of East Germany
Olympic cyclists of Germany
Olympic gold medalists for Germany
Olympic medalists in cycling
Sportspeople from Leipzig
Medalists at the 1992 Summer Olympics
UCI Track Cycling World Champions (women)
German female cyclists
German track cyclists
Cyclists from Saxony
People from Bezirk Leipzig